Mornington railway station was located on Railway Grove, Mornington, Victoria, Australia. The first train arrived on 10 September 1889 and the last one departed on 20 May 1981. In 1989, the old station site was sold by the state government and a shopping centre built on the site. On 19 September 2004, a plaque was unveiled adjacent to the site to commemorate 150 years of rail in Victoria.

Mornington tourist station

A new Mornington station was built for tourist services and is located on the corner of Yuilles & Watt Road. It is the new site of the terminus for the Mornington Railway line. The Mornington Tourist Railway has run services from there since 21 October 1997.

References

External links
 Mornington Railway
 Melway map at street-directory.com.au

Disused railway stations in Melbourne
Railway stations in Australia opened in 1889
Railway stations closed in 1981